The Jill Smythies Award of the Linnean Society of London was established in 1986 and is awarded annually to a botanical artist.

The award was established by Bertram Smythies, in honour of his wife, Florence Mary Smythies ("Jill"), whose career as a botanical artist was cut short by an accident to her right hand.

Recipients of the Jill Smythies Award 

 Alice Tangerini (2020)
Deborah Lambkin (2019)
 Niki Simpson and Juliet Williamson (2018)
 Karin Douthit and David Williamson (2017)
 Anita Barley (2016)
 Claire Banks (2015)
 Esmee Somers Winkel (2014)
 not awarded (2013)
 not awarded (2012)
 Margaret Tebbs (2011)
 Susan Sex (2010)
 Halina Bednarek-Ochyra (2009)
 Patricia Eckel (2008)
 Jan van Os (2007)
 Bobbi Angell (2006)
 Lesley Elkan (2005)
 Lucy Theres Smith (2004)
 Maya Koistinen (2003)
 Jenny Brasier (2002)
 Juan Luis Castillo (2001)
 Bo Mossberg and Jean Annette Paton (2000)
 Pandora Sellars (1999)
 Rodella Anne Purves (1998)
 Celia Elizabeth Rosser (1997)
 Bent Jonsen (1996)
 Rosemary Wise (1995)
 Joy Claire Allison Dalby (1994)
 Caroline Mary Bates (1993)
 John Mark Fothergill (1992)
 Dale Edna Evans (1991)
 Gillian Condy (1990)
 Christabel King (1989)
 Ann Farrer (1988)

See also

 List of European art awards

References

British art awards
Linnean Society of London
Botanical art
Awards established in 1986
1986 establishments in England